The pond was a currency unit issued in the Orange Free State and the South African Republic. It was prepared for, but not issued, in New Griqualand.

The word pond is Afrikaans for the word "pound". In fact, the South African pound banknotes of the South African Reserve Bank have the word "Pond" inscribed, as do the banknotes of South West Africa that were issued between the 1930s and 1959.

See also

Orange Free State pond
South African Republic pond

Numismatics
Currencies of Africa
Currencies of South Africa
History of South Africa